Saint Theodoric of Mont d'Hor (or Theudric, Thierri, Thierry; died 533) was a disciple of Saint Remigius who became abbot of Saint-Thierry Abbey, near Reims, France.
His feast day is 1 July.

Monks of Ramsgate account

The monks of St Augustine's Abbey, Ramsgate wrote in their Book of Saints (1921),

Butler's account

The hagiographer Alban Butler (1710–1773) wrote in his Lives of the Fathers, Martyrs, and Other Principal Saints under July 1,

Baring-Gould's account

Sabine Baring-Gould (1834–1924) in his Lives Of The Saints wrote under July 1,

Notes

Sources

 
 
 

6th-century Frankish saints
533 deaths